Burntollet Bridge was the setting for an attack on 4 January 1969 during the first stages of the Troubles of Northern Ireland. A People's Democracy march from Belfast to Derry was attacked by Ulster loyalists whilst passing through Burntollet.

The march had been called in defiance of an appeal by Northern Ireland Prime Minister Terence O'Neill for a temporary end to protest. The Northern Ireland Civil Rights Association and some Derry nationalists had advised against it. Supporters of Ian Paisley, led by Major Ronald Bunting, denounced the march as seditious and mounted counter-demonstrations along the route.

At Burntollet an Ulster loyalist crowd numbering in the region of 300, including 100 off-duty members of the Ulster Special Constabulary (USC), attacked the civil rights marchers from adjacent high ground. Stones transported in bulk from William Leslie's quarry at Legahurry were used in the assault, as well as iron bars and sticks spiked with nails. Nearby members of the Royal Ulster Constabulary (RUC) did little to prevent the violence. Many of the marchers described their assailants' lack of concern about the police presence.

The violence was followed by renewed riots in Derry City. Terence O'Neill described the march as "a foolhardy and irresponsible undertaking" and said that some of the marchers and their supporters in Derry were "mere hooligans", outraging many, especially as the attackers had evaded prosecution. Loyalists celebrated the attack as a  victory over Catholic "rebels".

The ambush at Burntollet irreparably damaged the credibility of the RUC. Professor Paul Bew, an academic at Queen's University Belfast who as a student had participated in the march, described it as "the spark that lit the prairie fire" (i.e. led to the Troubles).

References

The Troubles (Northern Ireland)
Riots and civil disorder in Northern Ireland
Royal Ulster Constabulary
Protests in Northern Ireland
1969 riots
1969 in Northern Ireland
January 1969 events in the United Kingdom